There is a small community of Ugandans in India consisting largely but not exclusively of Ugandans of Indian descent.

Migration History

Immigration from Uganda to India began in the 1970s when Idi Amin, President of Uganda, gave Uganda's Asians (mostly Gujaratis of Indian origin) 90 days to leave the country, following an alleged dream in which, he claimed, God told him to expel them. In addition, Amin was eloquent in defending the expulsion in terms of giving Uganda back to the ethnic Ugandans. About a thousand Ugandan Asians fled to India after the expulsion as well as other countries such as Canada, Kenya, Pakistan, West Germany, Malawi, and the United States.

There are over 800 Ugandan students in India, which has emerged as a preferred destination for higher studies among African nations. Kampala is keen to sign a pact with New Delhi to make it easier for study visas and short-term job permits.

In popular culture
 The 1976 Bollywood film, Charas focuses on an Ugandan Indian moving to India due to the expulsion.
 In the 2009 Bollywood movie 3 Idiots, the comedic character Chatur Ramalingam or "The Silencer" (played by Omi Vaidya) is portrayed as a college nerd who is an ethnic Tamil born in Uganda.

Notable people
 Shimit Amin - Indian film director
 Supra Singhal - Ugandan swimmer

See also
India–Uganda relations

References

Ugandans
 
Ugandan diaspora
India–Uganda relations